Scrobipalpa arenbergeri is a moth in the family Gelechiidae. It was described by Povolný in 1973. It is found in Austria, Hungary, the Czech Republic, Slovakia, Croatia, Italy, Ukraine, the southern Ural mountains and Transbaikal.

Adults are uniform brownish-grey to dark grey with a varying amount of blackish marks. The hindwings are light grey-whitish.

The larvae possibly feed on Centaurea scabiosa.

References

Scrobipalpa
Moths described in 1973